Víkingur can refer to:

 The Icelandic and Faroese word for Viking
 Víkingur Ólafsson, Icelandic pianist
 Knattspyrnufélagið Víkingur, Icelandic association football club
 Víkingur Gøta, Faroese association football club
 Ungmennafélagið Víkingur (Víkingur Ólafsvík), Icelandic association football club

Norwegian language